Marlos Romero Bonfim (born 7 June 1988), or simply Marlos, is a professional footballer who plays as an attacking midfielder. Born in Brazil, he represented the Ukrainian national team.

Club career
Marlos was born in São José dos Pinhais. In July 2014, he signed a five-year contract with Shakhtar Donetsk.

In 2016–17, Marlos was recognized as a player of the month of the Ukrainian Premier League on three occasions (November 2016, May 2017, and July 2017) becoming the most-titled by the award.

On 20 October 2017, there surfaced information that Marlos was paid one million dollars, which was said to be a bonus for extending his contract (four years). Supposedly, this was done to solve the problem regarding the limit of foreign players allowed on the Shakhtar squad. The same day, Shakhtar Donetsk issued its official press release denying the pay out.

In the 2017–18 Ukrainian Premier League he scored 18 league goals only to yield the top scorer of the season title to his teammate Facundo Ferreyra with 21 tallies.

On 31 December 2021, Marlos left Shakhtar Donetsk following the expiration of his contract.

On 1 February 2022, Marlos signed for Athletico Paranaense.

International career
On 30 September 2017, FFU announced that Marlos was called up to play for Ukraine in the upcoming games of the World Cup qualification against Kosovo and Croatia. Marlos made his debut for Ukraine on 6 October 2017, replacing Artem Kravets in the second half of a 2–0 away win against Kosovo in Shkodër (Albania) as part of the 2018 FIFA World Cup qualification. He is the second Brazilian-born to play for Ukraine after Edmar Halovskyi who represented Ukraine in 2011–2014.

Career statistics

International

Scores and results list Ukraine's goal tally first, score column indicates score after each Marlos goal.

Honours
Coritiba
 Brazilian Série B: 2007
 Paraná State League: 2008

Shakhtar Donetsk
 Ukrainian Premier League: 2016–17, 2017–18, 2018–19, 2019–20,
 Ukrainian Cup: 2015–16, 2016–17, 2017–18, 2018–19,
 Ukrainian Super Cup: 2014, 2015, 2017, 2021
Individual
 UEFA Europa League Squad of the Season: 2015–16
 Ukrainian Premier League Footballer of the Year: 2016, 2017, 2018
 Ukrainian Premier League best player of season: 2017–18
 Football Stars of Ukraine – Best UPL player: 2017, 2018

References

External links
 
  
 

1988 births
Living people
Association football midfielders
Association football wingers
Sportspeople from Paraná (state)
Ukrainian people of Brazilian descent
Naturalized citizens of Ukraine
Ukrainian footballers
Ukraine international footballers
Brazilian footballers
Brazilian emigrants to Ukraine
Coritiba Foot Ball Club players
São Paulo FC players
Club Athletico Paranaense players
FC Metalist Kharkiv players
FC Shakhtar Donetsk players
Campeonato Brasileiro Série A players
Ukrainian Premier League players
UEFA Euro 2020 players
Ukrainian expatriate footballers
Brazilian expatriate footballers
Expatriate footballers in Uruguay
Expatriate footballers in Ukraine
Expatriate footballers in Brazil
Brazilian expatriate sportspeople in Uruguay
Brazilian expatriate sportspeople in Ukraine
Ukrainian expatriate sportspeople in Brazil